The 2014 end-of-year rugby tests, also known as the 2014 autumn internationals in the Northern Hemisphere, were international rugby union matches predominantly played between visiting Southern Hemisphere countries and European nations.

Brazil, Canada, Germany, Georgia, Hong Kong, Japan, Namibia, Paraguay, Portugal, Romania, Russia, the United States and Uruguay A all played at least one test match during the three-week international window.

Within the window, the three Pacific Island teams faced Tier 1 opposition, when Wales and France hosted Fiji, and England and Italy hosted Samoa. At the time, Italy entered the Samoa test on the back of nine consecutive losses and a 15–0 loss to Samoa in Apia in June 2014. Scotland became the first Tier 1 nation to play a Test match on a fully artificial pitch when they hosted Tonga at Rugby Park, Kilmarnock, winning 37–12.

Georgia had a rare opportunity to play a Tier 1 nation in Ireland, who played The Lelos for the first time since their Pool D fixture in the 2007 Rugby World Cup. Ireland became the first Tier 1 nation to play Georgia since Argentina in June 2013, and the first Six Nations team to host a European Nations Cup team since Scotland's 48–6 win over Romania during the 2006 Autumn Internationals.

The United States played host to New Zealand for the first time since 1980, though that was not an official test match. Therefore, this was the first official test match between the two in America since 1913, when the All Blacks were 51–3 victors, and the last meeting between the two nations took place during the 1991 Rugby World Cup. The All Blacks won the game 74–6 in front of a sell-out crowd at Soldier Field.

History was made in Hong Kong, when a first-ever meeting between Hong Kong and Russia took place, and in Windhoek with a first-ever meeting between Germany and Namibia on Namibian soil.

Argentina visited Scotland, Italy and France, as they tried to build upon their first Rugby Championship win. Australia traveled to Wales, Ireland, England and France, who they had beaten 3–0 in their 2014 June Test series. New Zealand played Scotland, Wales and England, who had lost 3–0 to the All Blacks in their June Test series, while South Africa competed against Ireland, England, Wales and Italy.

Following a reduced 2014 IRB Pacific Nations Cup, the IRB organized matches between the Pacific island countries and North American teams at neutral venues in Europe; Tonga and Fiji played the United States, while Samoa played Canada. In addition to those, Romania hosted both Canada and the United States, while Romania and Georgia hosted Japan. Georgia also hosted Tonga for just their third meeting, the first since 1999.

Following the qualification of Namibia for the 2015 Rugby World Cup, an IRB–funded tour allowed Namibia to test themselves against higher ranked opposition; they played Canada in Colwyn Bay and Portugal in Lisbon. In preparation for a big year in Brazilian sport ahead of the introduction of Rugby sevens into the Olympic Games, Brazil hosted Uruguay and Paraguay to broaden their depth in the sport before their automatic participation in the 2016 competition.

Like in recent seasons, New Zealand and Australia played the third and final Bledisloe Cup Test match for the year, with New Zealand winning 29–28 with a last-minute try.

Matches

October

Notes:
 Adam Ashley-Cooper became the sixth Australian player to earn 100 test caps, and the first to score a try in his 100th test.
 Adam Ashley-Cooper equaled David Campese's record of 8 tries scored against the All Blacks.
 Benn Robinson and Ben Alexander both equaled Al Baxter's 69 test caps and became the Wallabies' most-capped props.
 During the post-match press conference, Wallabies head coach Ewen McKenzie announced his resignation.

Notes:
 JC Greyling, Torsten van Jaarsveld and Tjiuee Uanivi made their international debuts for Namibia.
 Chris Kleebauer and Benedikt Scherrer made their international debuts for Germany.

1 November

	
Notes:	
 Australia won the Killik Cup, after the Barbarians won it in 2013 against Fiji and England failed to reclaim it in June 2014.

Notes:
 The attendance for this match more than tripled the previous record crowd for an international rugby match in the U.S. of 20,181, set in June 2013 when the USA hosted Ireland at BBVA Compass Stadium in Houston. Soldier Field, with a 61,500 capacity, was sold out a week before the match.
 The score was a record for the All Blacks against the US, surpassing their 51–3 victory in 1913.
 Augustine Pulu made his international debut for New Zealand.
 Tim Stanfill made his international debut for the United States.

7/8 November

Notes:
 Jordan Wilson-Ross made his international debut for Canada.
 Franklin Bertolini made his international debut for Namibia.

Notes:
 John Aikmen, Reece Hamon, Jack Parfitt, Duncan Pollock and James Richards made their international debut for Hong Kong.
 Sergey Chernysev, Vasily Dorofeyev, Ilya Dyomushkin, Nikolay Serkov and Vitaly Zhivatov made their international debuts for Russia.
 Vasily Artemyev earned his 50th test cap for Russia.

Notes:
 Paea Fa'anunu and Siua Halanukonuka made their international debuts for Tonga.

Notes:
 Italy ends a 9 consecutive losing streak with their first win since their 37–31 against Fiji in November 2013.
 Kelly Haimona made his international debut for Italy.
 Michael and Winston Stanley, Pete Cowley and Patrick-Albert Toetu made their international debuts for Samoa.
 Quintin Geldenhuys earned his 50th test cap for Italy.

Notes:
 New Zealand retain the Hillary Shield.
 George Kruis, Anthony Watson and Semesa Rokoduguni made their international debuts for England.

Notes:
 Australia retain the James Bevan Trophy.
 Sean McMahon and Tetera Faulkner made their international debuts for Australia.
 Australia win their 10th consecutive match over Wales, surpassing their record of 9 consecutive wins over Wales.

Notes:
 Robert Neagu made his international debut for Romania.
 John Cullen, Greg Peterson, Benjamin Tarr and Matt Trouville made their international debuts for the United States.

Notes:
 Uini Atonio, Xavier Chiocci, Alexandre Dumoulin, Rory Kockott, Charles Ollivon, Scott Spedding and Teddy Thomas made their international debuts for France.
 Alipate Ratini and Nemia Soqeta made their international debuts for Fiji.

Notes:
 Jared Payne made his international debut for Ireland.
 This was Ireland's first win over South Africa since 2009.
 Ireland became the first Six Nations team to beat South Africa since Scotland's 21–17 win in November 2010.

Notes:
 Mark Bennett made his international debut for Scotland.
 Brothers Jonny and Richie Gray became the 21st set of brothers to play for Scotland together.
 Juan Cruz Guillemaín and Facundo Isa made their international debuts for Argentina.
 Juan Martín Hernández earned his 50th test cap for Argentina.
 This was Scotland's first win over Argentina at Murrayfield since their first ever meeting in 1990.

14/15/16 November

Notes:
 Lucas Ponce and Guido Petti (both Argentina) made their international debuts.
 This fixture was originally scheduled for 15 November 15:00 CET kick off. But the match was brought forward by the FIR because of the bad weather expected to hit the region.

Notes:
 Alofa Alofa, TJ Ioane, Rey Lee-Lo and Ahsee Tuala made their international debuts for Samoa.
 Richard Thorpe made his international debut for Canada.

Notes:
 Russia wins the Ustinov Cup series 2–0.

Notes:
 Daniel Carpo earned his 50th test cap for Romania.
 Karne Hesketh, Keita Inagaki and Amanaki Lelei Mafi made their international debuts for Japan.

Notes:
 Danny Care earned his 50th test cap for England.
 With this loss, England lose their fifth consecutive match, their worst run of defeats since their 7 consecutive losses in 2006 - although four of the five were against world champions New Zealand.

Notes:
 Nicky Smith made his international debut for Wales.

Notes:
 Sione Lea made his international debut for Tonga.

Notes:
 James Parsons made his international debut for New Zealand.

Notes:
 Sekope Kepu earned his 50th test cap for Australia.
 France reclaim the Trophée des Bicentenaires after losing it in June 2014.

Notes:
 Robin Copeland, Dominic Ryan and Dave Foley made their international debuts for Ireland.
 Lasha Malaghuradze earned his 50th test cap for Georgia.

21/22/23 November

Notes:
 Taniela Koroi made his international debut for Fiji.
 Ronnie McLean made his international debut for the United States.

Notes:
 Samuela Vunisa made his international debut for Italy.
 Nizaam Carr and Julian Redelinghuys made their international debuts for South Africa.

Notes:
 Ireland reclaim the Lansdowne Cup for the first time since 2006.
 Henry Speight made his international debut for Australia.
 With this win, Ireland earn their first Autumn series clean-sweep, since their 2006 Autumn series campaign.

Notes:
 Luke Charteris earned his 50th test cap for Wales.
 New Zealand Captain Richie McCaw, captained his side for the 100th time. Coincidentally his first match as captain, was against Wales at the Millennium Stadium during the 2004 end-of-year tests.
 Following this match, Brodie Retallick was named World Rugby Player of the Year, the sixth and third consecutive All Black to achieve the award, the All Blacks were named World Rugby Team of the Year for the eighth and fifth consecutive time, and Steve Hansen was named World Rugby Coach of the Year for the third consecutive year.

Notes:
 Tomás Lezana made his international debut for Argentina.
 Argentina beat France for the first time on French Soil, since their 34–10 win during the 2007 Rugby World Cup third-place match.

Notes:
 Giorgi Aptsiauri made his international debut for Georgia.
 This was Georgia's first win over Japan, bar in their second game.

29 November

Notes:
 Rob Simmons earned his 50th test cap for Australia.
 England retained the Cook Cup.

Notes:
 Wales win the Prince William Cup for the first ever time since its creation in 2007.
 Wales beat South Africa for the first time since 1999, and for just the second time.
 Wales beat a Southern hemisphere great (Australia, New Zealand, South Africa) for the first time since 2008, ending a 22 match losing streak.

See also
 End of year rugby union tests
 Mid-year rugby union tests
 2014 mid-year rugby union tests
 2014 Māori All Blacks tour of Japan

Notes

References

2014
2014–15 in European rugby union
2014 in Oceanian rugby union
2014 in North American rugby union
2014 in South American rugby union
2014 in African rugby union
2014 in Asian rugby union